Augusta Township is one of twenty-four townships in Hancock County, Illinois, USA.  As of the 2010 census, its population was 795 and it contained 385 housing units.

Geography

Cities, towns, villages
 Augusta
 Plymouth (partial)

Unincorporated towns
 Pulaski at 
(This list is based on USGS data and may include former settlements.)

Cemeteries
The township contains these four cemeteries: Old Augusta, Pulaski, Trimble and Woodland City.

Major highways
  Illinois Route 61
  Illinois Route 101

Lakes
 Augusta Lake

Landmarks
 Community Park
 Fairground

Demographics

School districts
 Southeastern Community Unit School District 337

Political districts
 Illinois's 17th congressional district
 State House District 93
 State Senate District 47

References
 United States Census Bureau 2008 TIGER/Line Shapefiles
 
 United States National Atlas

External links
 City-Data.com
 Illinois State Archives
 Township Officials of Illinois

Townships in Hancock County, Illinois
Populated places established in 1849
Townships in Illinois
1849 establishments in Illinois